Diadegma dispar is a wasp first described by Johann Friedrich Gmelin in 1790.

References 

dispar
Insects described in 1790
Taxa named by Johann Friedrich Gmelin